Nepal-Tibet War may refer to:
 First Nepal-Tibet War, invasion of Tibet by Nepal from 1788–1789
 Second Nepal-Tibet War (also called Sino-Nepalese War), invasion of Tibet by Nepal from 1791–1792
 Third Nepal-Tibet War, invasion of Tibet by Nepal from 1855-1856